Tulus is the debut studio album by Indonesian recording artist Tulus. The album was produced by Ari Renaldi and released by Tulus Record in September 2011. It also launched by Demajors. The album contains 10 songs, including "Merdu Untukmu", "Diorama", and "Sewindu".

Tulus wrote most of the songs, like "Sewindu", "Teman Hidup", "Kisah Sebentar", "Tuan Nona kesepian" and "Jatuh Cinta" which dominated the charts on radio stations across Indonesia. The self-titled album was top the charts on January until February 2012, by Rolling Stone Indonesia.

Track listing

Personnel
Tulus – lead vocals, lyrics, backing vocal
Anto Arief – guitar, lyrics (track no 2, 6)
Razis Henry – lyrics
Ari Renaldi – producer, drum, keys
Rudy Zulkarnaen – upright bass (track no 2, 3, 7, 8)
Grace Sahertian, Marshella Safira, Lukman Hakim – backing vocals (track no 2, 3)
Topan Abimanyu – guitar (track no 3, 4, 7, 8)
Brury Effendi – trumpet, flugerhorn (track no 3, 7)
Imam Praseno – piano (track no 3)
dr. Gega Nesywara – electric bass (track no 4)
Sindhu Bayusekti – bass (track no 5, 6)
Ivan Jonathan – piano, rhodes (track no 5, 10)
Marshella Safira, Lukman Hakim – backing vocal (track no 6)
Grace Sahertian – backing vocal (track no 7)

Popular culture
The cover of the album was used as the butt of jokes for meme-makers.

References

2011 albums
Indonesian-language albums